BBC Jam (formerly known as BBC Digital Curriculum) was an online educational service operated by the BBC from January 2006 to 20 March 2007. The service was available free across the United Kingdom offering multi-media educational resources. Jam was the BBC's provision for the Digital Curriculum, an initiative launched by the British Government to provide computer-based learning in UK schools, and had a budget of £150 million. The service was shut down due to a legal challenge concerning fair trading by the BBC.

Content

The content of the service was connected with the National Curriculum for schools in England, Wales, Scotland and Northern Ireland. It covered school subjects such as maths, science, literacy, geography, business studies and languages, and was designed to provide free, independent computer-based learning for school children.

The service was required to support users with disability by incorporating accessibility features such as audible text, subtitles on videos etc. There were also subjects which were translated into Welsh, Scottish Gaelic and Irish.

History

Prior to launch

BBC Jam was commissioned in 2003 by the Secretary of State for Culture, Media and Sport, and designed:-
 to stimulate, support and reflect the diversity of the UK
 to innovate continually and to promote technological and pedagogical experimentation
 to be distinctive from, and complementary to, services provided by the commercial sector

In consultation with BECTA, the Government's educational technology department, the service was allowed to cover no more than 50% of the learning outcomes that are amendable to ICT.

Closure
The service was suspended on 20 March 2007 at the request of the BBC Trust, in response to complaints made to the European Commission by a number of commercial producers of interactive educational products who felt that the BBC was exceeding its public service remit by offering free content to schools which could be provided commercially. This resulted in departmental restructuring and a number of job losses in the BBC. The Trust requested that the BBC management prepare a fresh proposal, including how the BBC should deliver its Charter obligation — promoting formal education and learning, whilst meeting the online needs of school age children.

The new proposal was subjected to a full Public Value Test by the Trust and a market impact assessment by Ofcom, the United Kingdom's telecoms regulator.

In February 2008 it was announced that the BBC's digital curriculum project would finally be closed.

References

External links
Digital agency Cimex builds e-learning resource for BBC Jam
BBC axes online education jobs

BBC controversies
BBC New Media
British educational websites
Information technology organisations based in the United Kingdom
Internet properties established in 2006
Internet properties disestablished in 2007
Internet services shut down by a legal challenge
Irish-language websites
2006 establishments in the United Kingdom
2007 disestablishments in the United Kingdom
Scottish Gaelic education
Welsh-language mass media